Ragnagild (5th-century – fl. 485) was a Visigoth queen consort by marriage to king Euric (466–484).

Ragnagild is known from the work of Sidonius Apollinaris to have acted as the patron of poets and artists. She could speak Latin, was apparently educated, and she is speculated to have had influence over state affairs.

References

Visigothic queens consort
5th-century women